Milton Karisa (born 27 July 1995) is a Ugandan professional footballer who plays  as a right winger for Uganda Premier League club Vipers and the Uganda national team.

Club career
Milton played club football in Jinja Municipal Council Football Club from 2011 to 2013, Bul FC from 2013 to 2016, and is currently at Vipers S.C.

BUL FC
Milton in 2013 joined Bul FC  from Jinja Municipal Football Club. He made his debut for the club against Kansai Plascon FC (formerly known as Sadolin Paints FC) in 2013, while he scored his first goal for Bul against Kiira Young FC at Namboole Stadium.

Vipers SC
Milton joined Vipers S.C. in January 2017,  making his debut for Vipers against Lweza FC at Namboole stadium]; the game ended 2–0 in favour of Vipers where by Milton made an assist.
Milton scored his first goal for  Vipers on 10 March 2017 against Platinum Stars at St. Mary`s Stadium in a CAF Confederation Cup qualifier. It was  an important and historic goal on the day Vipers opened their new stadium, St Mary’s in Kitende.

MC Oujda
Milton joined MC Oujda in September 2018 and signed a two-year contract.  On 22 September 2018, Milton made his debut for the club against Kawkab AC Marrakech, which was  played at the Marrakesh Stadium, with Milton scoring his first goal for Oujda in the match.

Return to Vipers SC
In January 2020, Milton returned to Vipers
 
On 25 February 2020, Karisa scored a goal and assisted another in Vipers' 5–0 home win against Maroons FC.

International career 
Milton made his debut for the Uganda national team against Kenya in a 1–1 friendly draw at Machakos Stadium on 23 March 2017.

International goals
Scores and results list Uganda's goal tally first.

Honours
Vipers SC
Uganda Cup runner-up: 
2018
Uganda Premier League (2):
 2017–18, 2019–20

References

External links
 
 

1995 births
Living people
Ugandan footballers
Association football midfielders
Uganda international footballers
People from Jinja District
Ugandan expatriate footballers
Vipers SC players
MC Oujda players
Botola players
Ugandan expatriate sportspeople in Morocco
Expatriate footballers in Morocco
Uganda A' international footballers
2018 African Nations Championship players
2020 African Nations Championship players
2022 African Nations Championship players